Australis Aquaculture, LLC is a producer and marketer of ocean-farmed barramundi, headquartered in Greenfield, Massachusetts, which is solely focused on offshore aquaculture, and operates its own barramundi farm in Vietnam. Australis is widely considered responsible for popularizing barramundi to North America.

History
Australis CEO Josh Goldman first began experimenting with closed-containment aquaculture in the 1980s, when he was a student at Hampshire College. After graduating, he founded one of the first commercial aquaponics farms, and went on to spend the next fifteen years in commercialize closed containment-farming technology as an entrepreneur and consultant. In the early 2000s, Goldman spent three years prospecting for new types of fish to farm and was introduced to barramundi by an Australian entrepreneur. After testing over 30 species of fish in order to determine which was optimal for aquaculture, Goldman chose barramundi because of its low environmental impact and ability to breed in captivity, in addition to what he believed to be an appealing taste and exceptional nutritional value.

The company was founded in 2004 in Turners Falls, Massachusetts, where it first began producing barramundi using recirculating aquaculture system technology in Western Massachusetts.

Although Australis was able to raise barramundi successfully, one of the largest challenges the company faced was popularizing a relatively unknown fish in the American market. Goldman said: “We were reaching out and building relationship with top chefs who were passionate about sustainability, dietitians who were trying to get people to eat more fish (but often worried about contaminants), and environmentalists whose mission was to protect the oceans.”

In 2004 Australis Aquaculture established its first barramundi farm in Turner Falls, Massachusetts. In 2007, the company expanded its production into Van Phong Bay, in central Vietnam. In September 2018, Australis sold one of its US farms to Great Falls Aquaculture.

Activities
Australis once used Recirculating Aquaculture Systems (RAS) technology in their land-locked Turner Falls facility to raise barramundi. Australis’ Vietnamese operation uses a combination of on-shore closed containment tanks with off-shore cages in the open ocean. 

Australis harvests and processes their fish, selling under its own brand, as well as private labels. The company’s Vietnamese facility produces primary flash frozen filets which are sold to foodservice distributors and prominent retailers, including the restaurant French Laundry which first carried Australis Barramundi in 2008, Whole Foods and HelloFresh.

Environmental impact
Part of the barramundi’s sustainability comes from the fact that it can be raised on a predominantly plant-based protein diet without sacrificing the nutritional benefits of the product. According to The Atlantic, “they have the rare ability to transform vegetarian feed into sought-after omega-3 fatty acids. Salmon require as much as three pounds of fish-based feed to put on a pound of meat. Goldman’s barramundi need only a half pound, the bulk of which is made from scraps from a herring processing plant.”

The founder Josh Goldman also launched the venture Greener Grazing he launched to develop Asparagopsis cultures to feed livestock and significantly reduce the associated methane gas emissions. Australis Aquaculture is a longtime partner of the seafood sustainable program Ocean Wise.

References

Further reading
Paul Greenberg Four Fish (2010) Penguin Books, hardcover: , 2011 paperback:

External links
The Better Fish

2004 establishments in Massachusetts
American companies established in 2004
Aquaculture in the United States
Companies based in Franklin County, Massachusetts
Seafood companies of the United States
Fish processing companies